Baruipur Purba Assembly constituency is a Legislative Assembly constituency of South 24 Parganas district in the Indian State of West Bengal. It is reserved for Scheduled Castes.

Overview
As per order of the Delimitation Commission in respect of the Delimitation of constituencies in the West Bengal, Baruipur Purba Assembly constituency is composed of the following:
 Begampur, Belegachi, Brindakhali, Champahati, Hardah, Nabagram, Ramnagar I, Ramnagar II and South Garia gram panchayats of Baruipur community development block
 Bamangachi, Chaltaberia, Dhosa Chandaneshwar, Jangalia, Khakurdaha and Narayani Tala  gram panchayats of Jaynagar I community development block

Baruipur Purba Assembly constituency is a part of No. 22 Jadavpur (Lok Sabha constituency).

Members of Legislative Assembly

Election Results

Legislative Assembly Election 2011

Legislative Assembly Elections 1977-2006
In 2006, Rahul Ghosh of CPI(M) won the Baruipur Assembly constituency defeating his nearest rival Arup Bhadra of AITC. Arup Bhadra of AITC defeated Sujan Chakraborty of CPI(M) in 2001. Sovandeb Chattopadhyay of INC defeated Sujan Chakraborty of CPI(M) in 1996 and Hemen Majumdar of CPI(M) in 1991. Hemen Majumdar of CPI(M) defeated Arup Bhadra of INC in 1987, Jalil Gazi of INC in 1982 and Ram Kanta Mondal of INC in 1977.

Legislative Assembly Elections 1952-1972
Lalit Gayen of INC won in 1972. Bimal Mistry of CPI(M) won in 1971. Kumud Ranjan Mondal of SSP won in 1969 and 1967. Sakti Kumar Sarkar of INC won in 1962. In 1957 and 1952, Baruipur Assembly constituency had joint seats. Khagendra Kumar Roy Choudhury and Gangadhar Naskar, both of CPI, won in 1957. In 1952, Lalit Kumar Sinha of CPI and Abdus Shukur of INC, won.

References

Notes

Citations

Assembly constituencies of West Bengal
Politics of South 24 Parganas district